Men at Birth is a book from Australian writer David Vernon.

The book is an edited anthology of birth experiences, written by men.  The experiences described are diverse, ranging from caesarean births and VBAC births, to births that take place at home and in a birth centre or labour ward.

Steve Biddulph stated:

The book has caused some controversy with its view that men who are poorly prepared for birth should not attend the birth of their child, as it may make the birth more difficult for the woman.

On 13 December 2007, Men at Birth was the winner of the ACT Writing and Publishing Awards for Best Nonfiction Book of the Year. The award was made by Jon Stanhope.

References

Works cited
 Canberra Times, Men in Labour, by Karen Hardy, 29 August 2006
 Rebirth of the Father, Herald Sun, 1 Sept 2006
 Interview with Sylvia Tobler, Canberra FM91.1, Bretzelfunk, 7 Sept 2006
 Book Review - Accessed 19 Feb 2007

External links
David Vernon's Home Page

Health and wellness books
Works about childbirth
Fatherhood
Works about human pregnancy
Books about parenting